The Borneo lowland rain forests is an ecoregion, within the tropical and subtropical moist broadleaf forests biome, of the large island of Borneo in Southeast Asia. It supports approximately 15,000 plant species, 380 bird species and several mammal species. The Borneo lowland rain forests is diminishing due to logging, hunting and conversion to commercial land use.

Location and description
The World Wildlife Fund has divided Borneo into seven ecoregions: five areas of lowland forest; the central Borneo montane rain forests; and the Kinabalu montane alpine meadows. The lowlands are distinguished by climate (as the eastern side of the island is drier) or separated by the large Kapuas River and Barito River, which prevent animals and reptiles from spreading freely around the island.

The other lowland ecoregions, in addition to the Borneo lowland rain forests, are: 
Borneo peat swamp forests
Sundaland heath forests
Southwest Borneo freshwater swamp forests
Sunda Shelf mangroves.

Climate
Lowland Borneo has a stable climate, with monthly rainfall exceeding 8 inches throughout the year and a temperature range of more than 18°C.

Flora
The lowlands of Borneo are home to the richest rainforest in the world. The climate provides an ideal growing environment for approximately 10,000 species of plant (more than in the whole continent of Africa). Among these are some 2,000 species of orchids and 3,000 species of trees, including 267 species of dipterocarps (family Dipterocarpaceae), of which 155 are endemic to Borneo. This makes the island the center of the world's diversity for dipterocarps.

Mixed dipterocarp forests, including lowland and hill forests, are the predominant plant community. The forests have a closed canopy 24 to 36 meters high, with emergent trees up to 65 meters tall extending above the canopy. Dipterocarps are the most common emergents, comprising up to 80% of the emergent stratum. The dipterocarp genera Dipterocarpus, Dryobalanops, and Shorea are typically emergents, while the dipterocarp genera Hopea and Vatica are common canopy trees. Koompassia excelsa (Fabaceae) is an emergent tree with a distinctive white trunk that can reach up to 85 meters high. Trees from the plant families Burseraceae and Sapotaceae are also common in the canopy.

There is an understorey stratum under the canopy, composed of shade-tolerant trees draped with lianas and epiphytic orchids and ferns. Understorey trees are commonly of the plant families Euphorbiaceae, Rubiaceae, Annonaceae, Lauraceae, and Myristicaceae. Cauliflory – trees which bear flowers and fruits on their trunks – is common among understorey trees, including the forest durian (Durio testudinarius). Forest floor plants include five species of the strong-smelling parasite Rafflesia, one of which, Rafflesia arnoldii, has flowers over a metre wide, making it the world's largest flower.

The limestone uplands of the Sangkulirang Peninsula and Sarawak support their own particular plant communities, as do the Labi Hills on the Brunei-Sarawak border.

Fauna
The wildlife of this ecoregion consists of a large number of forest animals ranging from the world's smallest squirrel, the least pygmy squirrel, to the largest land mammal in Asia, the Asian elephant. It includes the critically endangered Sumatran rhinoceros, the endangered and iconic Bornean orangutan, twelve other species of primate, Bornean bearded pigs and Bornean yellow muntjac deer. The primates of Borneo are: three apes (Bornean orangutan, Müller's Bornean gibbon and Bornean white-bearded gibbon), five langurs, the southern pig-tailed macaque, the long-tailed macaque, Horsfield's tarsier (Tarsius bancanus), the Sunda slow loris (Nycticebus coucang) and the endangered proboscis monkey (Nasalis larvatus). There are no tigers on Borneo; carnivores include the endangered Sunda clouded leopard (Neofelis diardi), the sun bear (Helarctos malayanus), the otter civet (Cynogale bennettii), and several other mustelids and viverrids.

The 380 species of birds include eight hornbills, eighteen woodpeckers and thirteen pittas. There are nine near-endemic and two endemic birds; the black-browed babbler (Malacocincla perspicillata) and the white-crowned shama (Copsychus stricklandii). Among the rich variety of reptiles and amphibians are crocodiles and the earless monitor lizard (Lanthanotus borneensis). The sounds of the forest vary from day to night as different combinations of these birds and animals emerge to roam and feed.

Biogeography
During the Pleistocene glacial epoch, all of Borneo, Java, Sumatra, and mainland Indochina were part of the same landmass, called Sundaland. This allowed plants and animals to migrate from one region to the next. Now Borneo is separated from the Malay Peninsula and the islands, but it still shares a lot of the same plant and animal diversity, while Sulawesi has less Borneo wildlife.

Threats and preservation

Logging and conversion of natural forests to rubber, oil palm and industrial timber plantations and for small-scale farming have given rise to significant deforestation in recent decades. In 1982–83 and again in 1997–98, forest fires in Kalimantan cleared around 25,000 km2 each time for oil palm planting. Further threats in Sabah come from exploration for oil and coal in the Maliau Basin and the draining of the wetlands on the Klias Peninsula. In 2001, the World Wildlife Foundation forecast that "If the current trend of habitat destruction continues, there will be no remaining lowland forests in Borneo by 2010." Although this forecast has not been fulfilled, in 2008 the IUCN Red List reported a 2005 prediction that "forest cover on the island of Borneo, if current deforestation rates continue, is projected to decline from 50% to less than one-third by 2020".

Protected areas
6.267 of the ecoregion is in protected areas. These include:
In Brunei: Ulu Temburong National Park.
In Kalimantan: Betung Kerihun National Park, Bukit Baka Bukit Raya National Park, Danau Sentarum National Park, Gunung Palung National Park, Kayan Mentarang National Park, Kutai National Park, Meratus National Park, Sebangau National Park, and Tanjung Puting National Park.
In Sabah: Balembangan Forest Reserve, Bidu Bidu Forest Reserve, Binsuluk Forest Reserve, Botitian Forest Reserve, Bukit Kuamas Forest Reserve, Bukit Taviu Forest Reserve, Crocker Range National Park, Danum Valley Conservation Area, Deramakot Forest Reserve, Gomantong Forest Reserve, Kinabalu Park, Klias Forest Reserve, Lipaso Forest Reserve, Maliau Basin Conservation Area, Mandamai Forest Reserve, Mount Pock Forest Reserve, Silabukan Protection Forest Reserve, Tabin Wildlife Reserve, Tangkulap Forest Reserve, Tawai Forest Reserve, Tawau Hills National Park, Ulu Kalumpang Forest Reserve, and Ulu Telupid Forest Reserve.
In Sarawak: Batang Ai National Park, Batu Laga National Park, Bukit Hitam Nature Reserve, Bukit Kana National Park, Bukit Lima Nature Reserve, Bukit Mersing National Park, Bukit Sembiling Nature Reserve, Bakun Islands National Park, Bukit Tiban National Park, Bungo Range National Park, Dered Krian National Park, Fairy Cave Nature Reserve, Gunung Buda National Park, Gunung Gading National Park, Gunung Mulu National Park, Gunung Pueh National Park, Kuching Wetlands National Park, Kubah National Park, Lambir Hills National Park, Limbang Mangrove National Park, Loagan Bunut National Park, Niah National Park, Pelagus National Park, Sampadi National Park, Semenggoh Nature Reserve, Similajau National Park, Sungai Meluang National Park, Tanjung Datu National Park, Usun Apau National Park, and Wind Cave Nature Reserve.

References

 
Borneo
Ecoregions of Asia
Ecoregions of Brunei
Ecoregions of Indonesia
Ecoregions of Malaysia
Ecoregions of Malesia

Indomalayan ecoregions
Natural history of Brunei
Tropical and subtropical moist broadleaf forests
Tropical rainforests of Indonesia